Siambr or Y Siambr [] may refer to:

 Y Siambr, the Welsh Parliament or Senedd's debating chamber 
Tŷ Hywel (Siambr Hywel), its former, now youth, chamber
Y Siambr (TV series), an S4C game show
 Any chambered cairn in Wales
 Siambr Trawsfynydd, a mountain in West Wales